Greatest Hits is a compilation album by American country music artist Tanya Tucker. It was released by Capitol Records in July 1989, containing the new song, "My Arms Stay Open All Night," and most of the singles from the albums Girls Like Me, Love Me Like You Used To and Strong Enough to Bend (although the Top 10 singles "Highway Robbery" and "Call On Me" were omitted). The album peaked at number 20 on the Billboard Top Country Albums chart and was certified Gold by the RIAA.

Track listing

Charts

Weekly charts

Year-end charts

References

1989 greatest hits albums
Tanya Tucker albums
Capitol Records compilation albums
Albums produced by Jerry Crutchfield